The Fountain dello Sprone, or Fontana dello Sprone, also called the Fontana del Buontalenti is an early 17th-century Mannerist-style public fountain found at the corner of via dello Sprone and Borgo San Jacopo, in the quarter of Oltrarno in the city of Florence, region of Tuscany, Italy. 

The fountain, located at the acute angle (sprone) formed by the intersection of the two streets, nestled against the private building, was designed and sculpted by Bernardo Buontalenti and completed in 1608, likely for the celebration of the wedding of Cosimo II de' Medici and Maria Maddalena d'Austria. The fountain consists of a grotesque bearded face with a water spout protruding from its mouth, with a swirling marble conch basin below. It has undergone various restorations: in the 17th century by Giuseppe del Rosso, and a recent restoration in 2014.

References

Outdoor sculptures in Florence
Renaissance sculptures
Fountains in Florence